Louis-Jules Barbon Mancini-Mazarin, 10th Duke of Nevers (16 December 1716 – 25 February 1798) was a French diplomat and writer.

The Duke was the sixth member elected to occupy seat No. 4 of the Académie française in 1742. In England, he was styled Duke of Nivernois, whilst in Italy, where his family originated they are known as Mancini-Mazzarino.

Biography
Mancini was born in Paris, son of Philippe Jules François Mancini (the 3rd and last duke of Nevers from 1707 until his death in 1768), and Anna Maria Spinola, whom he married in 1709. His father, Philippe, was a great-nephew of Cardinal Mazarin and a great-grandson of the famous beauty Gabrièlle de Rochechouart de Mortemart, sister of Madame de Montespan.

Mancini (hyphenated Mazarin, Mazarini or Mazzarino) was educated at Lycée Louis le Grand before he joined the French Army serving in the Italian campaigns (1733) and in Bohemia (1740); but, he had to give up soldiering on account of weak health. In 1738, he sold property including the château de Druyes to Louis Damas marquis of Anlezy.

He was subsequently French Ambassador to Rome (1748–1752), Berlin (1755–1756) and London, where he negotiated the Treaty of Paris (10 February 1763). From 1787 to 1789 he was a member of the Council of State. He chose not to emigrate during the Revolution, which led to the loss of all his money and he was imprisoned in 1793. He regained his liberty after the fall of Maximilien Robespierre, and died in Paris on 25 February 1798.

In 1743 the Duke was elected to the Académie française for a poem entitled Délie, and from 1763 he devoted the greater part of his time to the administration of his Burgundian estates in Nevers as well as to Belles-lettres. He wrote a great deal and with great facility; but his writings nowadays are generally considered to be of little value, his Fables being his best work. His Œuvres complètes were published in Paris in 1796; an edition of his Œuvres posthumes was brought out in Paris by Nicolas-Louis François de Neufchâteau in 1807, and his Correspondance secrète was published in Paris by De Lescure in 1866.

Family
At the age of fourteen, he was married to Hélène-Françoise-Angélique Phélypeaux de Pontchartrain (1715–1781), daughter of Jérôme Phélypeaux, comte de Pontchartrain, and they had five children:

 unnamed Mancini-Mazarini (1737)
 Hélène-Julie-Rosalie Mancini-Mazarini (1740–1780), married in 1753 to Louis-Marie Foucquet de Belle-Isle, comte de Gisors (1732–1758), son of the Duke of Belle-Isle, himself son of Nicolas Fouquet who purchased Belle-Isle; married again to Louis-Camille de Lorraine, comte de Marsan, brother of the Duchess of Bouillon without issue;
 Adélaïde-Diane-Hortense-Délie Mancini-Mazarini (1742–1808), married Louis Hercule Timoléon de Cossé, Duke of Brissac;
 Jules-Frédéric Mancini, styled Count of Nevers (1745–1753), died in infancy;
 Louis Mancini (1748–1748), died in infancy.

Styled Prince de Vergagne whilst heir to his father's titles, he was also a Prince of the Holy Roman Empire and a Knight of the Golden Fleece and of the Holy Spirit. The dukedom became extinct upon his death.

See also 
 Mancini family
 List of Ambassadors of France to the United Kingdom

References

External links

 www.burkespeerage.com
 

1716 births
1798 deaths
Writers from Paris
Dukes of Nivernais
18th-century French poets
18th-century French male writers
18th-century French diplomats
Ambassadors of France to the Holy See
Ambassadors of France to Prussia
Ambassadors of France to Great Britain
Members of the Académie Française
Mancini Mazarini
French noble families
Grandees of Spain
18th-century peers of France
French fabulists
Members of the Conseil d'État (France)
State ministers of France
Lycée Louis-le-Grand alumni